Conquer may refer to:

Conquer (Soulfly album), 2008
Conquer (Carl Thomas album), 2011
"Conquer" (The Walking Dead), an episode of the television series The Walking Dead

See also

 
Conquistador (disambiguation)
Conqueror (disambiguation)
Conquest (disambiguation)